Karangana is a village and rural commune in the Cercle of Yorosso in the Sikasso Region of southern Mali. The commune covers an area of 398 square kilometers and includes 9 villages. In the 2009 census it had a population of 17,299. The village of Karangana, the administrative center (chef-lieu) of the commune, is 32 km southwest of Yorosso.

References

External links
.

Communes of Sikasso Region